The Jining–Datong–Yuanping high-speed railway, also referred to in Chinese under the acronym Jidayuan high-speed railway is a Chinese high-speed railway connecting Ulanqab, Inner Mongolia with Datong and Yuanping, Shanxi Province. The line runs from Ulanqab railway station in Inner Mongolia, passes through Datong, Shuozhou, and Xinzhou in Shanxi along the way, and finally connects with the Datong–Xi'an high-speed railway. One of the important parts of the Hohhot–Nanning corridor, the Datong–Yuanping section is also an important part of the Beijing–Kunming corridor. The Jining–Datong–Yuanping HSR is an important route between Inner Mongolia and the south. After completion, the travel time between Hohhot and Taiyuan will be shortened from the current 5 hours to 3 hours.

History

The precursor of the Jining–Datong–Yuanping HSR project was the Datong–Yuanping HSR project, which was incorporated into the Jining–Datong–Yuanping HSR project in December 2018.

In February 2016, Shanxi Province decided to build the Datong–Yuanping HSR. On June 15, the "Environmental Impact Report on the New Daton–Yuanping Railway Passenger Dedicated Line" was published in its entirety. In July, the Shanxi Provincial Development and Reform Commission approved the "Feasibility Study Report on the New Datong–Yuanping Railway Passenger Dedicated Line". On 9 July, the Environmental Protection Department of Shanxi Province approved the "Environmental Impact Report of the New Datong–Yuanping Railway Passenger Dedicated Line". On 12 August, the construction of the preliminary section of the Dayuan high-speed railway started.

In April 2017, the Shanxi Provincial Development and Reform Commission approved the "Preliminary Design of the New Datong-Yuanping Railway Passenger Dedicated Line", and Daixian West Station was relocated from the territory of Yuanping City to the territory of Daixian County. In April, Shanxi Dayuan Railway Passenger Dedicated Line Company commissioned China Railway Design Group Co., Ltd. to carry out the environmental impact assessment of the change of the new Datong–Yuanping Railway Passenger Dedicated Line. In July, the Dayuan Railway Passenger Dedicated Line Company completed the design of the detailed construction plans for the whole line, making possible the start of construction of the whole line. Due to changes in policy, adjustments to the cost of project investment, construction and operation, and many other factors, the Dayuan high-speed railway project was put on hold.

In April 2018, the Datong-Yuanping HSR announced the completion of the environmental impact report of the changes. In July, the Environmental Protection Department of Shanxi Province approved the "Environmental Impact Report on the Change of the New Datong-Yuanping Railway Passenger Dedicated Line". In December, Datong-Yuanping HSR was included in the development of the Jining–Datong–Yuanping HSR project, and the design work was carried out, which was approved by the National Development and Reform Commission of China and led by China Railway Corporation.

On 27 March 2019, the Development and Reform Commission of Shanxi Province and the Development and Reform Commission of Inner Mongolia Autonomous Region held a promotion meeting for the preliminary work of the Datong-Yuanping HSR. In December, Inner Mongolia Railway Investment Co., Ltd. and Shanxi Dayuan Railway Co., Ltd. commissioned China Railway Design Group Co., Ltd. to carry out the environmental impact assessment of the Jining–Datong–Yuanping HSR. On 12 December, the first information session on the Jining–Datong–Yuanping HSR environmental impact assessment was conducted. On 27 December, the National Development and Reform Commission of the People's Republic of China approved the "Feasibility Study Report on the New Jining-Datong-Yuanping Railway".

The second announcement of the environmental impact assessment of the Jining–Datong–Yuanping HSR was made on 18 May 2020. On 30 June, the groundbreaking ceremony for the Jining–Datong–Yuanping HSR was held in Shuozhou City.

Construction of the Shanxi section officially started on 17 November 2021. The erection of the first box girder in the Shanxi section was completed on 15 July 2022.

References 

High-speed railway lines in China
Rail transport in Shanxi
Rail transport in  Inner Mongolia
25 kV AC railway electrification